Rikke Larsen Øyerhamn (born 23 August 2000) is a Norwegian handball player who plays for Molde Elite in REMA 1000-ligaen and the Norwegian national team.

She also represented Norway at the 2018 Women's Youth World Handball Championship, placing 11th.

She made her debut on the Norwegian national team on 21 April 2022, against North Macedonia.

Achievements 
REMA 1000-ligaen
Bronze: 2018/19

References

2000 births
Living people
Norwegian female handball players
Sportspeople from Bergen
21st-century Norwegian women